The 1946 Connecticut Huskies football team represented the University of Connecticut in the 1946 college football season.  The Huskies were led by 12th-year head coach J. Orlean Christian, and completed the season with a record of 4–3–1.

Schedule

After the season

The 1947 NFL Draft was held on December 16, 1946. The following Huskies were selected.

References

Connecticut
UConn Huskies football seasons
Connecticut Huskies football